Hassa may refer to:

 Hassa, Hatay, a district of Hatay Province in Turkey
 Hussa bint Ahmed Al Sudairi (also called Hassa; 1900–1969), wife of King Abdulaziz of Saudi Arabia
 a slang term for the South American edible fish Hoplosternum

See also
 Al-Hasa (disambiguation)